Thomas Bredahl (born 2 November 1980) is a Danish music manager, former guitarist and singer. He was lead guitarist of Volbeat and is now the guitarist of Gob Squad. Bredahl joined Volbeat in 2006, and the band announced his departure on November 28, 2011. He was the successor of Franz Gottschalk, who was fired by Volbeat after the recording of their second album Rock the Rebel / Metal the Devil was completed.

After Volbeat he worked again with Gob Squad, where he was the lead singer. In present, he is partner and manager at Heartbeat Management.

Discography

with Gob Squad 
 2004: Call For Response
 2005: Far Beyond Control
 2008: Watch The Cripple Dance

with Volbeat 
 2008: Guitar Gangsters & Cadillac Blood
 2010: Beyond Hell/Above Heaven

References

External links 
 Official site

1980 births
Living people
Danish rock singers
Danish rock guitarists
Volbeat members
English-language singers from Denmark